Australian Survivor: All Stars is the seventh season of Network 10's Australian Survivor. For the first time, the season features 24 returning contestants from the four previous seasons that have aired on Network 10.  The season premiered on 3 February 2020, and concluded on 30 March 2020, where David Genat was named the winner over Sharn Coombes, winning the grand prize of A$500,000 and title of Sole Survivor.

Jonathan LaPaglia returned as host. However, due to the COVID-19 pandemic, LaPaglia could not travel from Los Angeles, where he resides, in time for the recording of the season finale and reunion without facing immediate self-isolation for 14 days. The reunion special was hosted by Osher Günsberg, with LaPaglia contributing from Los Angeles via Satellite link.

Contestants

Notes

Future appearances 
Shonee Bowtell (formally Fairfax) competed as a villain in Australian Survivor: Heroes V Villains.

After this season, Locky Gilbert appeared on the eighth season of The Bachelor Australia as the titular bachelor in 2020. David Genat competed on the fifth season of The Celebrity Apprentice Australia. Michelle Dougan competed in the tenth episode of The Cube in 2021 with her sister Sam. In 2022, Brooke Jowett and John Eastoe competed on The Challenge: Australia.

Season summary
24 All Stars from the previous four seasons were divided into two tribes, Mokuta and Vakama. Immediately, returning winners Shane and Jericho were picked off as they were major threats to the other contestants, leaving power players Henry and Mat on the back foot in Mokuta and Vakama with a clue for the same idol. Henry got it first. On Vakama, two groups formed spearheaded by David and Mat respectively, but David approached Mat to blindside his own alliance and to take revenge on Daisy for her blindside of him in their previous season. Henry gave Mat the idol, which got Daisy out. Mokuta struggled in challenges with the athletic players taking control to eliminate the more social players.

After a tribe swap, the new Vakama saw the majority alliance lose David and Phoebe, but utilized a scorned Shonee to take out the athletic alliance (Abbey, Lydia, and John) and the original minority leader, Mat. Meanwhile, the new Mokuta tribe managed to keep intact for a while, except when Phoebe didn't vote with David, and he and Moana chose to blindside Phoebe. Meanwhile, David found an immunity idol in a tree, and then got another one by stealing Phoebe's clue which led him to find it in a termite mound. Closer to the merge, a shrinking Vakama saw Brooke enact her revenge on Flick as payback for their first season, and Harry finding a Halting advantage which allowed him to halt any of the last two pre-merge tribal councils before the votes are read; he never exercised his advantage, sacrificing Nick.

At the merge, the new Mokuta alliance rallied together to take out the surviving Vakama members. Despite enjoying early success by eliminating physical and social threats, fractures formed in the Mokuta alliance when it was announced six players would compete against one another to remain in the game. Zach was betrayed by Jacqui who opted to flip on the alliance, though she was voted off for her actions shortly thereafter. After losing her Vakama allies, Brooke went on an immunity run to force the majority to cannibalize each other but fell short at the final four. David won the final immunity challenge and sent Moana to the jury in fear of her strategic game, over the ruthless double agent Sharn.

At the final Tribal Council, Sharn was criticized for her lying and baiting the Vakama minority for too long, and questioning her jury management compared to her first season. David had been painted as controlling and domineering throughout the entire season. Highlighting his charismatic social game at the original Vakama, including possessing two idols at the same time, and protecting his Mokuta allies where he could, David managed to convince the jury that his social and strategic dominant game was stronger than Sharn's, awarding him the title of Sole Survivor in an 8–1 vote. 

In the case of multiple tribes or castaways who win reward or immunity, they are listed in order of finish, or alphabetically where it was a team effort; where one castaway won and invited others, the invitees are in brackets.
Notes

Episodes

Voting history

Tribal Phase (Days 1-28)

Individual phase (Day 29–50)

Notes

Reception

Ratings

Ratings data is from OzTAM and represents the viewership from the 5 largest Australian metropolitan centres (Sydney, Melbourne, Brisbane, Perth and Adelaide).

Notes

References

External links 
 

2020 in Australian television
2020 Australian television seasons
Australian Survivor seasons
2019 in Fiji
Television shows filmed in Fiji
Television shows set in Fiji
Television series impacted by the COVID-19 pandemic